Flavius Taurus (died 449) was a politician of the Eastern Roman Empire, Consul in 428.

He was the son of Aurelianus, Consul in 400 and powerful Praetorian prefect of the East, and nephew of the Taurus who was Consul in 361. His son, Taurus Clementinus Armonius Clementinus, was consul in 513.

As his father, his grandfather and his uncle Flavius Eutychianus before him, he was Consul, in 428, and Praetorian prefect (of the East); he had also the rank of patricius between 433 and 434.

Bibliography
 Jones, Arnold Hugh Martin, John Robert Martindale, John Morris, The Prosopography of the Later Roman Empire, volume 1, Cambridge University Press, 1992, p. 1146

449 deaths
5th-century Romans
5th-century Roman consuls
Imperial Roman consuls
Praetorian prefects of the East
Patricii
Year of birth unknown